Heirs to the Dare is a reality television show which premiered on March 10, 2014 on The Discovery Channel.  The show followed three stunt performers in the footsteps of daredevils past, primarily Evel Knievel, to perform dangerous stunts today.  The three stunt performers are Henry “The Pitbull” Rife, Bubba Blackwell, and Super Joe Reed.  Discovery describes the show as "Bubba, Henry, and Super Joe soar through the air on bikes and ATVs for the thrill of it. They break bones, but they also break records."

Bubba Blackwell is best known for jumping the Harley-Davidson XR-750, the motorcycle most often used by Evel Knievel.  Bubba holds all known records for jumping the XR-750.  Henry Rife is best known for jumping an ATV and his appearance on The Late Show with David Letterman on September 28, 2007 where he jumped taxicabs on 53rd Street wearing a V-shaped red, white, and blue jumpsuit identical to Knievel's jumpsuit.  Joe Reed is a retired stunt performer who desires to recreate Knievel's famous failed Snake River Jump with an updated X-2 Skycycle.  Reed states that "even Evel Knievel called me 'crazy'".

References

2010s American reality television series
2014 American television series debuts
Discovery Channel original programming
2014 American television series endings